The 1995 William & Mary Tribe football team represented the College of William & Mary as member of the Mid-Atlantic Division of the Yankee Conference during the 1995 NCAA Division I-AA football season. Led by Jimmye Laycock in his 16th year as head coach, William & Mary finished the season with an overall record of 7–4 and a mark of 5–3 in Yankee Conference play, tying for third place the Mid-Atlantic Division. They were ranked No. 19 in the final Sports Network poll, but did not receive a bid to the NCAA Division I-AA playoffs.

Schedule

References

William and Mary
William & Mary Tribe football seasons
William and Mary Indians football